Kita Maru (Japanese: 喜多丸) was a Dutch-built, steel-hulled steamship that was seized by the Imperial Japanese Navy during World War II and converted into an auxiliary transport.

History
She was launched in 1918 at the Gusto Shipyard in Schiedam for the benefit of the Gouvernementsmarine and named Gemma. She was armed with a single 75 mm gun. She was scuttled by Dutch forces at Surabaya on 2 March 1942 after the Japanese occupation of the Dutch East Indies. On 27 October 1942, she was refloated and repaired by the No. 102 Naval Construction and Repair Department at Surabaya, Java. On 28 January 1943, her repairs were completed and on 1 August 1943, she was designated as a special transport ship, and assigned to the Sasebo Naval District. On 1 March 1944, she arrived at Surabaya as part of the Southern Expeditionary Fleet. She spent most of the war ferrying supplies and men and assisting disabled ships between ports in and around Indonesia (Kota Bharu, Surabaya, Balikpapan, and Samarinda).

She survived the war and was struck from the Navy List on August 15, 1945. Her last known port-of-call was Makassar.

References

Steamships

1918 ships
Ships built by Gusto Shipyard
Auxiliary ships of the Imperial Japanese Navy
Surabaya